Ilaoa and To'omata is an association football team from Pago Pago, American Samoa. They play in the territory's top division, the FFAS Senior League.

HONOURS : FFAS Senior League in 2022

Continental record

Squad
2022 Squad

References

Ilaoa and To'omata
Football clubs in American Samoa